The 2018 Pekao Szczecin Open was a professional tennis tournament played on clay courts. It was the 26th edition of the tournament which was part of the 2018 ATP Challenger Tour. It took place in Szczecin, Poland between 10 and 16 September 2018.

Singles main-draw entrants

Seeds

1 Rankings are as of 27 August 2018.

Other entrants
The following players received wildcards into the singles main draw:
  Nicolás Almagro
  Paweł Ciaś
  Karol Drzewiecki
  Maciej Rajski

The following player received entry into the singles main draw as a special exempt:
  Alex Molčan

The following players received entry from the qualifying draw:
  Facundo Argüello
  Marcelo Tomás Barrios Vera
  Alejandro Davidovich Fokina
  Jan Šátral

The following players received entry as lucky losers:
  Ivan Gakhov
  Roberto Marcora

Champions

Singles

 Guido Andreozzi def.  Alejandro Davidovich Fokina 6–4, 4–6, 6–3.

Doubles

 Karol Drzewiecki /  Filip Polášek def.  Guido Andreozzi /  Guillermo Durán 6–3, 6–4.

External links
Official Website

2018
2018 ATP Challenger Tour
2018 in Polish tennis